Mike Mahoney is an English retired football goalkeeper who played professionally in England and the United States.

In 1967, Mahoney began his professional career with Bristol City. He saw limited play before being acquired by Torquay United In August 1970. He played for Torquay until March 1975, when his contract was sold to Newcastle United. In November 1978, the Chicago Sting of the North American Soccer League purchased Mahoney's contract from Newcastle United. The Sting sent him to the California Surf halfway through the 1979 season. He played two and a half outdoor and two indoor seasons with the Surf. In 1982, he joined the Los Angeles Lazers of the Major Indoor Soccer League, spending four seasons with them. He retired in spring 1986 and became an assistant coach with the Lazers for the 1986–1987 season. In January 1987, he was named interim head coach after Peter Wall was fired. Following the demise of the Lazers, Mahoney retired. On the 9th of June 2018 it was announced that Mahoney had returned to football in a coaching role at Bristol Manor Farm.

References

External links
 
 NASL/MISL stats

1950 births
Living people
Footballers from Bristol
Association football goalkeepers
Bristol City F.C. players
California Surf players
Chicago Sting (NASL) players
English footballers
English expatriate footballers
English football managers
Los Angeles Lazers players
Major Indoor Soccer League (1978–1992) coaches
Major Indoor Soccer League (1978–1992) players
North American Soccer League (1968–1984) indoor players
Newcastle United F.C. players
North American Soccer League (1968–1984) players
Torquay United F.C. players
English expatriate sportspeople in the United States
Expatriate soccer players in the United States